Els Callens and Meghann Shaughnessy were the defending champions, but chose to play on separate teams for this year. Callens played alongside Chanda Rubin and were eliminated in the quarterfinals, while Shaughnessy teamed up with Magdalena Maleeva and lost in the second round.

Elena Dementieva and Janette Husárová won the title by defeating Daniela Hantuchová and Arantxa Sánchez Vicario 0–6, 7–6(7–3), 6–2 in the final. It was the 1st title for Dementieva and the 11th title for Husárová in their respective doubles careers.

Seeds
The first four seeds received a bye into the second round.

Draw

Finals

Top half

Bottom half

External links
Main and Qualifying Draws

Eurocard German Open - Doubles
WTA German Open